Souad Mekhennet (born 1978 in Frankfurt am Main) is a German journalist and author who has written or worked for The New York Times, Frankfurter Allgemeine Zeitung, The Washington Post, The Daily Beast and German television channel ZDF.

Early life and education
Mekhennet was born in 1978, the daughter of a Turkish mother and a Moroccan father; she grew up principally in Germany, but spent some years of her childhood in Morocco. She attended the Henri Nannen School for Journalism in Hamburg and the Johann-Wolfgang Goethe University in Frankfurt.

Career

Journalism 
Since 9/11, Mekhennet has covered conflicts and terrorist attacks in Europe, North Africa and the Middle East. She was one of two Times reporters who published the first story on Khaled el-Masri, a German citizen, who was detained, flown to Afghanistan, interrogated and allegedly tortured by the CIA for several months. She also worked on the series Inside the Jihad, published between 2007 and 2008, in which she and her colleague Michael Moss interviewed various jihadist leaders, including the head of Al-Qaeda in the Islamic Maghreb. In February 2015, she was the lead reporter of a Washington Post story that first revealed the true identity of the ISIS militant known as "Jihadi John".

Fellowships 
Mekhennet currently holds fellowships with the Weatherhead Center for International Affairs at Harvard University, the School of Advanced International Studies at Johns Hopkins University, the Geneva Center for Security Policy, and New America. She is the 13th Recipient of the Hanno R. Ellenbogen Citizenship Award jointly with conservationist Tony Fitzjohn presented annually by the Prague Society for International Cooperation and Global Panel Foundation. She is a European Young Leader (EYL40) alumni.

Books 
She is the co-author of two books in German: Islam (2006) and Die Kinder des Dschihad: Die neue Generation des islamistischen Terrors (2008); and one in English, with Nicholas Kulish: The Eternal Nazi: From Mauthausen to Cairo, the Relentless Pursuit of SS Doctor Aribert Heim (2014). Her memoir, I Was Told to Come Alone: My Journey Behind the Lines of Jihad, was published in 2017.

Books 
 Mekhennet, Souad and Michael Hanfeld. Islam. Würzburg: Arena (2006)
 Mekhennet, Souad, and Claudia Satter. Die Kinder des Dschihad: Die neue Generation des islamistischen Terrors. Munich: Piper Taschenbuch (2008), 
 Mekhennet, Souad and Nicholas Kulish. The Eternal Nazi: From Mauthausen to Cairo, the Relentless Pursuit of SS Doctor Aribert Heim. New York: Penguin Random House (2014), 
 Mekhennet, Souad. I Was Told to Come Alone: My Journey Behind the Lines of Jihad. New York: Henry Holt and Co. (2017)

References

External links

 
 

1978 births
German journalists
German non-fiction writers
German people of Moroccan descent
German people of Turkish descent
Goethe University Frankfurt alumni
Living people
The New York Times writers
The Washington Post journalists

German Muslims
German women journalists